Cremilda de Oliveira (6 November 1887 - 23 June 1979) was a Portuguese actress. Her filmography includes: A Viúva Alegre (1909); Es peligroso asomarse al exterior (1946); O Leão da Estrela (1947); O Grande Elias (1950); A Garça e a Serpente (1952); and O Comissário de Polícia (1953).

[citations from imdb - Portuguese site]

1887 births
1979 deaths
People from Lisbon
Portuguese film actresses
20th-century Portuguese actresses